is a 2009 Japanese horror film directed by Yōhei Fukuda.

Cast
Yusuke Yamada as Fujiwara
Masato Hyūgaji
Takafumi Imai
Kenta Itogi
Shinwa Kataoka
Kōhei Kuroda
Shion Machida
Shōichi Matsuda

References

External links
Official website 

Japanese horror films
2009 horror films
Films directed by Yōhei Fukuda
2009 films
2000s Japanese films